Lake Kaco is a lake located in the village of Lempur in the Mountain Kingdom district of Kerinci Regency, Jambi, Indonesia. The lake has an area of approximately 30 x 30 meters and has a depth is about 20 meters at its deepest point as confirmed with rope and stone measurement methods by local guides in the area  Lake Kaco is reported to be luminescent.

References

Kaco
Landforms of Jambi